778 Naval Air Squadron (778 NAS) was a Naval Air Squadron of the Royal Navy's Fleet Air Arm.

History
During the Second World War the squadron was a Service Trials Unit (STU) initially based at RNAS Lee-on-Solent, Hampshire, England before moving to RNAS Arbroath, Angus, Scotland on 6 July 1940. The squadron tested all types of aircraft that could be used by the Royal Navy. Key to this was testing new types for deck landing on aircraft carriers. Such aircraft included various types of Supermarine Seafires, Grumman Hellcats, Grumman Martlets, Grumman Avengers, and Vought Corsairs.

The squadron was reformed on 5 November 1951 with Douglas Skyraider AEW.1's but was disbanded on 7 July 1952 to form the basis of 849 Naval Air Squadron.

Notes

References 

700 series Fleet Air Arm squadrons
Military units and formations established in 1939
Air squadrons of the Royal Navy in World War II